J.E. Heartbreak is the second album by the American R&B group Jagged Edge. It was released by So So Def and Columbia on September 28, 1999, in the United States. The title of the album is a reference to R&B group New Edition's 1989 hit "N.E. Heart Break". Upon its release, the album peaked at number eight 8 on the US Billboard 200 and atop the Top R&B/Hip-Hop Albums. It was also certified platinum by the Recording Industry Association of America (RIAA) and reached silver status in United Kingdom.

The album spawned four singles, three of which made the top 20 on the Billboard Hot 100. While lead single "Keys to the Range" became the group's first single not to chart on the latter chart, second single "He Can't Love U" reached number 15 on the Hot 100, becoming the group's first top 20 single, while reaching number three on Billboards Hot R&B/Hip-Hop Singles & Tracks. "Let's Get Married" was the third single released from the album. It reached number eleven on Billboard Hot 100 and managed to become the group's first single to reach number one on the Hot R&B/Hip-Hop Singles & Tracks. Final single  "Promise" also reached the top of the chart.

Track listing

Samples
"Did She Say" contains excerpts from "Off the Books" as performed by The Beatnuts.
"Girl Is Mine" contains excerpts From "Spacewalk" as written by Kit Walker. 
"Can I Get With You" contains excerpts from "Much Too Much" as written by Marcus Miller.

Charts

Weekly charts

Year-end charts

Certifications

References

External links

1999 albums
Jagged Edge (American group) albums
Albums produced by Bryan-Michael Cox
Albums produced by Jermaine Dupri